David Albin Zywiec Sidor, OFM Cap (July 15, 1947 – January 5, 2020) was an American-Nicaraguan Roman Catholic bishop.

Born in East Chicago, Indiana, United States, Zywiec Sidor was ordained to the priesthood, for the Capuchin order, on June 1, 1974. On June 24, 2002, he was named titular bishop of Giri Marcelli and auxiliary bishop of the Roman Catholic Vicariate Apostolic of Bluefields, Nicaragua, and was ordained bishop on September 13, 2002. He then served as bishop of the Roman Catholic Diocese of Siuna, Nicaraqua, from 2017 until his death in 2020.

On 5 January 2020, Zywiec died at the Military Hospital of Nicaragua, where he was treated for a brain tumor.

References

Additional sources

External links

1947 births
2020 deaths
Deaths from brain cancer in Nicaragua
People from East Chicago, Indiana
American Roman Catholic priests
21st-century Roman Catholic bishops in Nicaragua
Catholics from Indiana
Capuchin bishops
American emigrants to Nicaragua
Roman Catholic bishops of Siuna
Roman Catholic bishops of Bluefields